Bryan Smith (born 21 August 1970) is a Scottish former footballer. He was a defender.

Smith began his career with hometown team Clydebank. He made 44 appearances for the Bankies, before signing for junior side Shettleston. He returned to the senior game in 1998, being one of eleven junior players to sign for Clyde. He spent five and a half years at Clyde, before leaving in January 2003 to join Maryhill. He made 149 appearances in all competitions with Clyde, but failed to score a goal.

References

External links

Living people
1970 births
Scottish footballers
Clydebank F.C. (1965) players
Clyde F.C. players
Scottish Football League players
Sportspeople from Clydebank
Footballers from West Dunbartonshire
Association football defenders
Maryhill F.C. players
Scottish Junior Football Association players
Glasgow United F.C. players